Radu Albot and Teymuraz Gabashvili were the defending champions but Albot decided not to participate.
Gabashvili was scheduled to play alongside Lukáš Rosol but they withdrew due to Rosol's right bicep injury.
Steve Darcis and Olivier Rochus defeated Tomasz Bednarek and Mateusz Kowalczyk 7–5, 7–5 in the final to win the title.

Seeds

Draw

Draw

References
 Main Draw

Prosperita Openandnbsp;- Doubles
2013 Doubles